Azab, Iran may refer to:
 Azab, Khuzestan ( – A‘ẕab)
 Azab, West Azerbaijan ( – ‘Az̄āb)